The Albany was a British car made in London from 1903 to 1905. Albany Manufacturing Co. Ltd made both petrol and steam cars, the steamers designed by Frederick Lamplough, who had originally built a shaft-driven steamer in 1896. Better known as the Lamplough-Albany, it sported two engines coupled by cranks at right angles and a super-heated coil-type generator. It could be steered either by wheel or tiller, and it appeared much like a petroleum-fueled car. It was offered for a single model year, 1903, while the petrol vehicles, one a  single-cylinder and the other a 16 hp 2-cylinder, lasted for three. After the middle of 1905, Albany shifted its attention to selling Talbots and manufacturing parts.

See also
 List of car manufacturers of the United Kingdom

References
Georgano, G.N., "Albany", in G.N. Georgano, ed., The Complete Encyclopedia of Motorcars 1885-1968  (New York: E.P. Dutton and Co., 1974), pp.31.

Defunct motor vehicle manufacturers of England
Motor vehicle manufacturers based in London